System Capital Management or SCM is a major Ukrainian financial and industrial holding company established in 2000 in Donetsk, Ukraine. As of 2014, it is headquartered in Kyiv. The business is controlled by Ukrainian businessman and oligarch Rinat Akhmetov, who owns 100% of the company's shares. In 2011, the group had revenues of around $19.5 billion and assets worth over $28.4 billion.

The company includes over 100 businesses in metals and mining, power generation, banking and insurance, telecommunications, media, real estate, and others. SCM employs approximately 200,000 people. The group is audited by PricewaterhouseCoopers.

As of May 2022, SCM (dba SCM Consulting Ltd) has been represented in the United States by the Washington, D.C. based public relations firm Qorvis LLC.

Structure

The biggest company in the SCM Group is Metinvest involved in the mining and steel business. It is one of Ukraine's largest private business and one of the biggest steel producers in Europe. It is also the largest Ukrainian producer of iron ore. In addition to Ukraine, Metinvest has assets in the US, Italy, UK, Bulgaria, and Switzerland.

The second major company of the group is a coal mining and power generation company DTEK. DTEK was formed in 2002. The nucleus of the complex consisted of Vostokenergo Power Generation Company, ServiceInvest Energy Company, and the coal mine Komsomolets Donbassa. The other companies ranged from scientifically oriented energy-sector companies to those in various social fields.

SCM also owns a large bank. In telecommunications, SCM has a fixed line business, Vega Telecom group. The Group's media interests include the newspaper Segodnya and Ukraina Media Group. The group is also in the real estate business and owns two five star hotels – one in Kyiv and one in Donetsk. SCM group also includes assets in heavy engineering, clay production, transportation, agriculture, and retail businesses.

SCM operations amid Russian military aggression 
On 22 February, when hundreds of people took to the streets of Mariupol protesting against Russia's aggressive acts, SCM shareholder Rinat Akhmetov announced that the Company was going to pay $34 million in taxes upfront to bolster Ukraine's treasury. "Our common goal is a strong, peaceful, independent, united Ukraine within its internationally recognised borders... Everyone must do everything in their power to strengthen the country... Unity is a matter of country's survival now," he said.

Shortly after Russia invaded Ukraine, the Company switched to wartime operations. Rinat Akhmetov stated that the Company's utmost goal in war conditions was to "help Ukrainians survive and withstand". "My Foundation is helping Ukrainians survive by providing water, food, medicines, and any help we can give here and now.

SCM businesses are helping the army and territorial defence forces defend our sovereignty, our freedom and independence, and win the war," he emphasised. Rinat Akhmetov further highlighted that SCM was using its international connections and opportunities to get the true information across to their international partners that peaceful Ukrainians were dying and suffering because of Russia's aggression: "What is unfolding here is a war crime and a crime against humanity, against Ukraine and the Ukrainians. This can neither be explained nor justified."

Since the outbreak of the war, SCM businesses together with the Rinat Akhmetov Foundation (ex-Foundation for Development of Ukraine) and FC Shakhtar Donetsk have channelled over UAH 1.4 billion ($48 million) to help Ukraine and the Ukrainians.

This includes the following assistance:
 SCM channels UAH 100 million to help Kyiv
 Metinvest purchases armour for territorial defence fighters for UAH 330 million.Metinvest Group's steel mills provide metal and make 35,000 anti-tank hedgehogs and spike strips against wheeled vehicles
 FUIB channels UAH 62.4 million to the Armed Forces of Ukraine and Territorial Defence Forces
 YASNO allocates UAH 5 million in humanitarian aid
 DTEK supplies free electricity to hospitals, military facilities and emergency services, and bakeries in three regions, costing around UAH 50 to 60 million per month. The company channels UAH 1.05 million to help territorial defence fighters and children's hospitals. Territorial Defence Forces receive fuel, protective gear, and communication devices. In addition, the power repair crews work 24/7 to restore the damaged power lines. During one month since the onset of the war, DTEK engineers have restored power for 300,000 Ukrainian households
 Ukrtelecom channels UAH 18.4 million to the Armed Forces of Ukraine and Territorial Defence Forces
 HarvEast Holding donates UAH 500,000 to the Armed Forces of Ukraine
 Lemtrans donates UAH 20 million in aid for the Ukrainian Armed Forces and 650,000 for the Territorial Defence Forces.

SCM's Metinvest and DTEK have joined efforts with the Rinat Akhmetov Foundation to launch the Saving Lives humanitarian project, which supplies food to IDPs as well as helps evacuate and accommodate people.

Metinvest, UMG Investments (Ukrainian company), DTEK and other SCM businesses have joined efforts to create a national and international network of carriers to supply humanitarian aid during wartimes: the Logistics Front. The objective of the logistics network is to help people as well as towns and cities affected by the Russian aggression, deliver food essentials and support the critical infrastructure facilities. The company calls for carries to join the network and become the logistics partners.

Assets affected as a result of Russian aggression 
Luhansk TPP was shelled on February 22, on the eve of invasion, during the escalation in certain areas of Donetsk Region and Luhansk Region (CADLR). It is the major source of heat and power in the region. DTEK noted that restoration works could be carried out only in case of ceasefire. From there, the power engineers and electricians will be able to make repairs and install the equipment to ensure operation of the plant as soon as the situation in the region is stabilised.

In his comments to WSJ the owner of two biggest Mariupol plants, Azovstal and Illich Iron and Steel Works, Rinat Akhmetov has stated that both plants are under Ukrainian control but have been temporarily shut down. "Russian troops are turning Mariupol into rubble, killing Mariupol residents and bombing the plants," he said. "Under no circumstances will these plants operate under the Russian occupation."

On March 13, 2022 Metinvest Group's Avdiivka Coke Plant came under heavy shelling. The shells damaged two coke shops and some other facilities of the plant. No one was injured.

In February 2023 all of Rinat Akhmetov's (owner of SCM Holdings) assets in Russian occupied Donbas were confiscated. The local Russian installed authorities justified this by declaring Akhmetov a "rogue individual."

Awards and recognition
In September 2011, under USAID support, the Centre for Corporate Social Responsibility Development published the results of the first Ukraine's Companies' Transparency Index. The top ten list included three SCM Group companies: System Capital Management, Metinvest and DTEK, while DTEK as number one in the list. SCM Group prepared the first corporate social responsibility report in Ukraine in 2005.

On 1 December 2011, SCM was honored at the Business Leadership Roundtable and Corporate Social Responsibility Awards Luncheon held during Ukraine's 20th Anniversary of Independence Gala events in Washington, D.C. On 15 December 2011, SCM took the first place at the National CSR Business Case 2011 Contest for its Contemporary Education social programme.

At the beginning of 2012, Metinvest, DTEK and SCM took three first places at the ranking compiled by Gvardiya national ranking magazine as the most socially responsible businesses in Ukraine.

See also
 Industrial Union of Donbas

References

External links
  – official website
 

 
Holding companies of Ukraine
Conglomerate companies of Ukraine
Ukrainian companies established in 2000